Amphidromus ngocanhi is a species of slender air-breathing tree snail, an arboreal gastropod mollusk in the family Camaenidae.

Habitat 
Amphidromus ngocanhi can be found on trees.

Distribution 
Amphidromus ngocanhi can be found in Đắk Nông Province, Central Vietnam.

Etymology 
This species is named after Phạm Ngọc Anh from Vietnam who provided the type material.

References

ngocanhi
Gastropods described in 2017